Pavel Pavlov (23 February 1885 – 23 April 1974) was a Soviet stage and film actor.

Filmography
 The Queen of Spades (1916)
 Satan Triumphant (1917)
 It Illuminates, My Dear (1922)
 Raskolnikow (1923)
 I.N.R.I. (1923)
 The Power of Darkness (1924)
 Secrets of a Soul (1926)

Bibliography
 Jung, Uli & Schatzberg, Walter. Beyond Caligari: The Films of Robert Wiene. Berghahn Books, 1999.

External links

1885 births
1974 deaths
Soviet male actors